Michael Edward Marks (born November 5, 1960) is an American author noted for his work in counterterrorism, special operations and counter illicit traffic, most recently including co-authorship of "Understanding Narrative: The Battle of the Narrative and the Operations Process" published by the U.S. Army Asymmetric Warfare Group in 2014, drawn from his work for US Special Operations throughout Afghanistan in 2011-2012.  Prior to this effort, Mr. Marks was responsible for mapping illicit traffic patterns across the Horn of Africa, Yemen, Central Asia and the Balkans in support of US Special Operations and the Joint Improvised Explosive Device Defeat Organization (JIEDDO).

Books, interactive programs and simulators developed by Mr. Marks have been incorporated into state-mandatory certification programs in 27 states, with adoptions by such entities as the US Army/FBI Hazardous Devices School, the FBI National Academy and throughout numerous federal and state-level law enforcement and intelligence agencies. These titles include The Emergency Responder's Guide to Terrorism.  He is credited with design of "Task Force Marks", a USMC expeditionary unit sniper team exercise for the TacOps simulation created by Maj. I.L Holdridge and subsequently licensed to USMC, Australian and New Zealand Armed Forces.

Mr. Marks served for twelve years as an Adjunct Professor on WMD at the George Washington University Department of Forensic Science  and developed the training/testing modules used by the American Board of Certification in Homeland Security for levels CHS I-III.

In addition to his technical work, Mr. Marks wrote the bestselling military science fiction novel Dominant Species (novel) which provides a depiction of Marines in powered armor. He is a critically acclaimed poet and songwriter best known for his patriotic writings in support of America's Armed Forces. Named the Poet Laureate of the Society of the 9th Infantry Division (United States) (SONID), Marks' work hangs in the Titan Missile Museum in Sahuarita, Arizona and has been featured in numerous books, magazines and newspapers around the world, to include Stars and Stripes (newspaper) and The Washington Times. and appears on the International War Veteran's Poetry Archive.

In 2007, Marks teamed with award-winning country music artist Michael Martin Murphey to create the hit country single adaptation of "A Soldier's Christmas" after the poem met with longstanding ovations in Murphey's national Cowboy Christmas tour, leading to a national release. Marks' works have been professionally produced by on-air personalities such as Thom Richards, WOKO Radio and air annually on radio stations across the United States.  In 2009, Chicago radio celebrity Paul Brian teamed with Joe Cantafio to produce a musical performance of "A Soldier's Christmas" to benefit the Wounded Warrior Project in their support of injured soldiers and their families. Several of these poems have been termed modern Christmas classics that have been incorporated into school plays and public presentations around the country.

References

External links 
  International War Veteran's Poetry Archive
 Society of the 9th Infantry Division SONID

1960 births
Living people
American male poets
21st-century American poets
21st-century American male writers